Seiler Pianofortefabrik GmbH is a piano manufacturer in Kitzingen, Germany.

The company was founded by Eduard Seiler in 1849 in Liegnitz, Silesia. By 1923 Seiler was producing up to 3,000 pianos per year, and became the largest piano manufacturer in Eastern Europe. After the WW2 and the loss of its production facilities, the company moved, first to Denmark, then, from 1961 onward, to the Bavarian town of Kitzingen. In 2008 the company was sold to Samick, a South Korean company. The company emphasizes that the instruments will always be manufactured separately with Seiler line been made in Germany.

Seiler now produces about 1,000 pianos annually between the Seiler brand, the mid-level Eduard Seiler brand and the entry-level Johannes Seiler brand.

Current Grand Piano Models

Current Upright Piano Models

Brands 
In addition to the Seiler brand, Seiler manufactures two other brands: Eduard Seiler for the mid-level market and Johannes Seiler for the entry-level market.

Eduard Seiler 
Made for the mid-level piano market, Eduard Seiler pianos are designed by Seiler and built by Samick factory in West Java, Indonesia.

Johannes Seiler 
Made for the entry-level piano market, Johannes Seiler pianos are designed by Seiler and built by Samick factory in West Java, Indonesia.

References

External links 

 Official homepage

Piano manufacturing companies of Germany
German companies established in 1849